The FGV Direito SP or Escola de Direito de São Paulo da Fundação Getulio Vargas (São Paulo Law School of Fundação Getulio Vargas) is a Brazilian private law higher education institution founded on July 1, 2002, in São Paulo by the Fundação Getúlio Vargas.

At that time, the school already provided at least twenty courses through the GVlaw program, which preceded the creation of Direito GV. Conceived in 2000 as a branch of the São Paulo Business School (EAESP) continued education programs and, later, in 2002, as a Direito GV learning initiative, GVlaw is now a reference for lato-sensu graduate legal studies, dedicated to the creation, development and organization of specialization, continued education and corporate courses.

References

External links 
 Official webpage of Direito GV
 Official webpage of FGV

2002 establishments in Brazil
Educational institutions established in 2002
Fundação Getulio Vargas
Law schools in Brazil